Elliot Straite, also known by his pseudonym Dr. Freeze, is an American singer, songwriter and record producer. His songs are mostly in the new jack swing style.

He wrote and produced the hit song "I Wanna Sex You Up" by R&B boy band Color Me Badd, wrote and produced "Poison" by Bell Biv DeVoe, and co-wrote and co-produced Break of Dawn for Michael Jackson's album Invincible.

Discography

As songwriter

 "Poison" by Bell Biv DeVoe (1990)
 "I Got the Feeling" by Today
 Poison (12")  Dennis Brown & Brian & Tony Gold   Greensleeves Records (1990)		
 Rock 'N Dance (CD, Comp) V.A.	Quality Music (1990)		
 I'm Back (7") Red Bandit  Motown (1990)		
 Over Proof  Dennis Brown  Greensleeves Records (1990)	
 "She's Dope!" by Bell Biv Devoe (1990)
 "I Wanna Sex You Up by Color Me Badd (1991)
 "The Mac" from the Jennifer Love Hewitt film Can't Hardly Wait
 "Spydermann" from the album Coolin' at the Playground Ya Know! by Another Bad Creation
 "Blue Gangsta" and "A Place with No Name" from the album Xscape by Michael Jackson 
 "Break of Dawn" from Invincible by Michael Jackson (2001)
 "Color Me Badd" from the album C.M.B.'' by Color Me Badd

References

Living people
Place of birth missing (living people)
American male songwriters
American record producers
Year of birth missing (living people)